Edward Clark Gaudin (December 26, 1931 – March 19, 2020) was an American politician. He served as a Republican member of the Louisiana House of Representatives.

Life and career 
Gaudin attended Louisiana State University and Paul M. Hebert Law Center. He served in the United States Army during the Korean War.

In 1967, Gaudin was elected to the Louisiana House of Representatives, winning a special election to complete Luther F. Cole's leftover term, serving until 1968, when he was succeeded by Lillian Walker. In 1972, he was elected again, succeeding Walker. He served until 1992, when he was succeeded by Chuck McMains.

Gaudin died in March 2020, at the age of 88.

References 

1931 births
2020 deaths
Republican Party members of the Louisiana House of Representatives
20th-century American politicians
Louisiana State University alumni
Louisiana State University Law Center alumni